Entente, meaning a diplomatic "understanding", may refer to a number of agreements:

History 
 Entente (alliance), a type of treaty or military alliance where the signatories promise to consult each other or to cooperate with each other in case of a crisis or military action
 Entente Cordiale (1904) between France and the United Kingdom
 Anglo-Russian Entente (1907) between the United Kingdom and Russia
 Triple Entente, an informal understanding between the Russian Empire, the French Third Republic and the United Kingdom of Great Britain and Ireland, built upon the Franco-Russian Alliance (1894), the Entente Cordiale (1904), and the Anglo-Russian Entente (1907)
 Allies of World War I, sometimes referred to as "The Entente", "The Entente Powers", or "The Entente Forces"
 Little Entente (1920–1938), between Czechoslovakia, Romania, and the Kingdom of Yugoslavia
 Balkan Entente (1934–1938), between Greece, Turkey, Romania and Yugoslavia
 Baltic Entente (1934–1939), between Lithuania, Latvia, and Estonia
 Conseil de l'Entente (1959), between Côte d'Ivoire, Burkina Faso, Benin, Niger, and (in 1966) Togo
 Entente frugale (beginning 2010), cooperation between the British and French governments

Other 
 Entente Florale Europe, an international horticultural competition
 International Entente Against the Third International, an international anticommunist organisation founded in 1924
 International Entente of Radical and Similar Democratic Parties, a political international existed in 1923–1938
 The Entente: Battlefields WW1, a 2004 video game

See also
Détente
L'Entente (disambiguation)